The Air Farce Comedy Album is a comedy album performed by the Royal Canadian Air Farce comedy troupe, released in 1979. The sketches were performed in CBC's Studio 4 over a two-day period on August 23 and 24, 1978. The never-before-performed sketches were performed in front of a live audience, allowing for spontaneous reaction.

The album was the winner of the Juno Award for Comedy Album of the Year at the Juno Awards of 1979.

Track listing
"Dinner by Candlelight"  – 1:35
"Sex Therapy Furnace"  – 3:37
"Flaw in the Law"  – 1:41
"Shakespearean Quackers"  – 5:15
"Amy's Tea Kettle"  – 2:15
"What Is a Canadian?"  – 2:29
"Theatrical Hijack"  – 7:08
"Intelligence Experiment"  – 1:21
"Pay"-Tel City"  – 2:08
"Canada Is..." – 2:40
"News from Baggleyburg"  – 5:11
"Sports: Bobby Clobber"  – 4:49
"Stay Fresh Mini Cars"  – 1:22
"Sergeant Renfrew: Limbo"  – 4:32

Personnel
 Roger Abbott
 Dave Broadfoot
 Don Ferguson
 Luba Goy
 John Morgan

External links
Listen to the album online

1979 albums
1970s comedy albums
Royal Canadian Air Farce albums
Juno Award for Comedy Album of the Year albums